Hyponephele davendra, the white-ringed meadowbrown, is a butterfly species belonging to the family Nymphalidae. It can be found from Iran to Afghanistan, India, and Pakistan, the Himalayas, Tibet, and central Asia.

The wingspan is 38–45 mm. Adults are on wing in multiple generations per year.

Subspecies
Hyponephele davendra seravschana (Ghissarsky, Zeravshansky, Turkestansky Mountains)
Hyponephele davendra fergana (Alaisky Mountains, norther and Inner Tian-Shan)
Hyponephele davendra latistigma (Kopet-Dagh, southern Ghissar)

References

Beitrag zur Lepidopteren-Fauna Afghanistans

Hyponephele
Fauna of Pakistan
Butterflies described in 1865
Butterflies of Asia
Taxa named by Frederic Moore